This is a list of notable alumni and faculty members of Trinity College Dublin and the University of Dublin.

Armed forces

Tom Clonan, retired Irish Army officer, author and security analyst
Eyre Coote (1762–1823), Irish British Army soldier and politician; Governor-General of Jamaica (1806–1808)
Henry George Gore-Browne (1830–1912), Irish British Army colonial of the 100th Regiment of Foot; awarded the Victoria Cross (circa 1857, while a captain of the 32nd Regiment of Foot)
James Murray Irwin (1858–1938), Irish British Army major-general doctor
Col. Ernest Achey Loftus, CBE, soldier, teacher and diarist
Michael Lynch, MMG (1942–2008), Irish Army officer and recipient of the Military Medal for Gallantry
Robert Nairac (1948–1977), English British Army captain; abducted and killed by the Provisional Irish Republican Army in 1977; posthumously awarded the George Cross (1979)
Robert Ross (1766–1814), Anglo-Irish British Army officer; participated in the Napoleonic Wars (various ranks); commander of the British force which sacked Washington, D.C. and burned down the White House, during the War of 1812 (as major-general)
Sir Hovenden Walker (1656/1666–1725/1728), Royal Navy officer

Arts

Lenny Abrahamson, Oscar-nominated film director
Thomas Bateson, 17th-century writer of madrigals
Aisling Bea, actress and comedian
Cathy Belton, actress
John Butler Yeats, artist 
David Benioff, filmmaker and co-creator of Game of Thrones
Michael Bogdanov, theatre director
Derbhle Crotty, actress
Brian Boydell, composer
Selina Cartmell, theatre director, and director of  the Gate Theatre
Michael Colgan, director of the Gate Theatre, film and television producer
Houston Collisson, musician
Anne Crookshank, emeritus professor of the history of art and founder of the faculty
Chris de Burgh, singer and musician
Thomas Manly Deane, architect
Pádraic Delaney, actor
Donnacha Dennehy, composer
Ciarán Farrell, composer
Margaret Fiedler, musician and singer
Susan Fitzgerald, actress
Percy French, songwriter and entertainer
Jack Gleeson, actor
Constantine Gregory, actor
Lisa Hannigan, singer
Aaron Heffernan, actor
Ciaran Hope, composer of orchestral, choral, and film music
Andrew Hozier-Byrne, singer-songwriter
Fergus Johnston, composer
Dillie Keane, singer-songwriter and actress
Lisa Lambe, actress and singer
Nathaniel Lande, author, filmmaker and former creative director of Time
Jacknife Lee, record producer
Allen Leech, actor
Damien Leith, singer
Eleanor McEvoy, singer-songwriter
Katie McGrath, actress
Sean Pol McGreevy, actor/musician
Paul McGuinness, manager of U2
Pauline McLynn, actress, comedian and novelist
Katie McMahon, singer and musician
Ruth Negga, actress
Jonathon Ng, musician
Méav Ní Mhaolchatha, singer
Sylvia O'Brien, opera singer
David O'Doherty, comedian
Rebecca O'Mara, actress
Matthew Pilkington, satirist and art historian
Laura Pyper, actress
Norman Rodway, actor
James Edward Rogers, architect and artist 
Andrew Scott, actor
Chris Singleton, singer-songwriter and producer
Max Stafford-Clark, theatre director
Rhys Thomas, film and television director
Stanley Townsend, actor
Tom Vaughan-Lawlor, actor
D. B. Weiss, novelist and co-creator of Game of Thrones
Garret Wesley, 1st Earl of Mornington, composer, father of the Duke of Wellington
Dominic West, British actor
Ian Whitcomb, singer and entertainer
James White, historical novelist

Broadcasting and journalism

Bruce Arnold, journalist and author
Sharon Ní Bheoláin, news presenter
James David Bourchier, Balkans correspondent for The Times and advisor to Tzar Ferdinand of Bulgaria
John Bowman, journalist and broadcaster
Rory Carroll, US West Coast correspondent, The Guardian
Tony Connelly, Europe Editor, RTÉ
Crosaire (J. D. Crozier), B.A. Dubl 1940, compiled the cryptic crossword for The Irish Times for fifty-nine years
Ray D'Arcy, television and radio presenter
Joe Duffy, radio presenter
Maia Dunphy, broadcaster 
Ken Early, soccer journalist 
Robert Fisk, journalist
Douglas Gageby, editor of the Irish Times
Veronica Guerin, crime reporter
Charles Graham Halpine, journalist
Vincent Hanna, Northern Irish television journalist
Brian Inglis, journalist, historian and television presenter
Mary Jordan, Pulitzer Prize-winning journalist
Aine Lawlor, radio and television presenter
Quentin Letts, British columnist and theatre critic
Martyn Lewis, British newsreader and journalist
Mark Little, journalist
Alex Massie, freelance journalist
David McWilliams, writer and broadcaster on economic and social issues 
Denis Murray OBE former BBC Ireland Correspondent.
Edmund O'Donovan, war correspondent
Rupert Pennant-Rea, former editor of The Economist
Gerry Ryan, radio presenter
Cliff Taylor, editor, Sunday Business Post
Nick Webb, Business Editor, Sunday Independent

Business

Paul Coulson
Lord Haskins of Skidby, chairman of Northern Foods
Alan Joyce, chief executive of Qantas
Laura Magahy, company director and former director of Sláintecare
Dermot Mannion, former chief executive of Aer Lingus
Michael O'Leary, chief executive of Ryanair
Willie Walsh, chief executive of British Airways

Economics

Sean Barrett, economist and member of Seanad Éireann
Peter Bellew, chief executive of Malaysia Airlines
Phelim Boyle (born 1941), academic and economist; pioneer of the use of Monte Carlo methods in derivatives pricing
George Alexander Duncan (1902–2006), professor of political economy
Francis Ysidro Edgeworth (1845–1926), philosopher and political economist
Morgan Kelly, professor of economics, University College Dublin
Philip R. Lane (born 1969), academic and economist
Kevin O'Rourke, Professor of Economic History, Oxford

Education

Robert Blackburn, International Secretary of the United World Colleges; Deputy Director General of the International Baccalaureate
Increase Mather, seventh president of Harvard University
McFadden Alexander Newell, first principal of Maryland State Normal School (Towson University)
Ferdinand von Prondzynski, president of Dublin City University
Louise Richardson, former executive dean of Radcliffe Institute for Advanced Study; political scientist at Harvard University; Principal of the University of St Andrews; first female Vice-Chancellor of the University of Oxford as of 1 Jan 2016

Science, mathematics, engineering and medicine

Beulah Bewley, public health physician
Denis Parsons Burkitt, surgeon and researcher into childhood cancer (cf. Burkitt's lymphoma)
William C. Campbell, Nobel Prize in Physiology or Medicine 2015
Georgia Chenevix-Trench, cancer researcher
Aeneas Coffey, engineer, inventor of the Coffey still
Steven Collins, co-founder of Havok
Andrew Hope Davidson,  physician and Master of the Rotunda Hospital
George Francis FitzGerald, professor of physics
Gordon Foster (1920–2010), fellow emeritus at the college; Professor of Statistics and Dean of the Faculty of Engineering and statistics; author of the International Standard Book Number (ISBN) system (a global standard), and the book Information Technology in Developing Countries
Aoife Gowen, researcher and professor
Oliver St John Gogarty, physician and ear surgeon
Alexander Henry Haliday, entomologist
Hugh Hamilton, professor of natural philosophy
William Rowan Hamilton, mathematician
William Henry Harvey, botanist
Caroline Hussey, microbiologist
Werner Israel, physicist 
John Joly, physicist and geologist
Sir John MacNeill, civil engineer
Robert Mallet, engineer and scientist
Una Martin, Clinical Pharmacologist
Richard Maunsell, Chief Mechanical Engineer, South Eastern and Chatham Railway, and Southern Railway
Henry Benedict Medlicott, geologist
William Molyneux, natural philosopher
Suzanne O'Sullivan, neurologist, prizewinning writer
Charles Algernon Parsons, engineer, inventor of the modern steam turbine
Thomas Preston, scientist
Ouida Ramón-Moliner, anaesthetist
Michael Roberts, mathematician
William Johnson Sollas, geologist and anthropologist
William Stokes, physician and professor
George Johnstone Stoney, physicist who proposed the term 'electron' for the fundamental unit of electricity
John Lighton Synge, mathematician and scientist
Charles Hawkes Todd, physician, professor, and president of the Royal College of Surgeons
Robert Bentley Todd, physician, Kings College professor, and identified with Todd's palsy
Edward Hutchinson Synge, Irish physicist and nanoscience pioneer
Ernest Walton, Nobel Prize winner
Benjamin Worsley, 17th-century physician, surveyor and alchemist
Peter Wyse Jackson, botanist

Humanities

James Auchmuty, historian, wartime MI6 propagandist and inaugural vice-chancellor of the University of Newcastle, Australia
Jonathan Bardon, historian
George Berkeley, philosopher (cf. subjective idealism)
Turtle Bunbury, historian and author
J. B. Bury, Irish historian and classicist
Anna Chahoud, Latin philologist
Edward Courtney , scholar of Latin literature
John Cruickshank, scholar of French literature, language, and culture
Edward Dowden, Shakespearean scholar
Roy Foster, Carroll Professor of Irish History, Hertford College, Oxford
Ian Graham (BSc 1951), Mayanist archaeologist
Edward Hincks, Orientalist
 Linda Hogan, fellow and Professor of Ecumenics
Declan Kiberd, Professor of Anglo-Irish Literature, University College, Dublin
R. J. B. Knight, naval historian 
Richard Layte, Professor of Sociology
William Edward Hartpole Lecky, historian
John V. Luce, classicist
F. S. L. Lyons, historian and Provost of Trinity College, Dublin
John Pentland Mahaffy, classicist
R. B. McDowell, historian
Robert McKim, philosopher of religion
Christine E. Morris, Andrew A. David Professor in Greek Archaeology and History
 Jane Ohlmeyer, historian 
Franc Sadleir, Regius Professor Greek and later Provost of Trinity College, Dublin; advocate for Catholic emancipation
Brendan Simms, historian and fellow of Peterhouse, Cambridge
William Bedell Stanford, senator and Regius Professor of Greek at Trinity College, Dublin
Alastair Sweeny, Canadian historian, publisher
Rory Sweetman, New Zealand historian
James Henthorn Todd, Regis Professor, co-founder of Irish Archaeological Society, president of Royal Irish Academy
Nikolai Tolstoy, historian

Law

Sir James Andrews, 1st Baronet, Lord Chief Justice of Northern Ireland
Deirdre Curtin, lawyer
Susan Denham, former Chief Justice of the Irish Supreme Court
Sir Valentine Fleming, chief justice of the Supreme Court of Tasmania
Henry Flavelle Forbes, C.I.E., President of the Court of Appeal, Iraq, 1920/21
Hari Singh Gaur, barrister, jurist and educationist in India
John George, Solicitor-General for Ireland
Edward Gibson, 1st Baron Ashbourne, Attorney-General and Lord Chancellor of Ireland
Maureen Harding Clark, judge of the International Criminal Court and the High Court of Ireland
Gerard Hogan, judge of the Court of Appeal 
Brian McCracken, retired Justice of the Irish Supreme Court; chair of the McCracken Tribunal
Catherine McGuinness, retired Justice of the Irish Supreme Court; former member of Seanad Éireann and President of the Law Reform Commission
Frank Murphy, United States Supreme Court Associate Justice (1940–49)
Patricia O'Brien, United Nations Under-Secretary-General for Legal Affairs and United Nations Legal Counsel
Christopher Palles, judge, Solicitor-General for Ireland
Alan Shatter, politician
James Skinner, Chief Justice of Zambia and Malawi
William Frederick L. Stanley (1872–1939), lawyer and judge in Republic of Hawaii
William Stawell, Chief Justice of the Supreme Court of Victoria
Egbert Udo Udoma, justice of the Nigerian Supreme Court and Chief Justice of Uganda
 Peter Whelan, professor of law

Literature

Sebastian Barry, novelist
Samuel Beckett, dramatist, Nobel laureate
Eavan Boland, poet
John Boyne, novelist
Nicholas Brady, poet and translator
Erskine Barton Childers, writer and journalist
Eoin Colfer, children's writer
Naoise Dolan, novelist
William Congreve, playwright and poet
Michael de Larrabeiti, author
J. P. Donleavy, Irish-American author
Richard Ellmann, literary critic and biographer
Anne Enright, novelist, winner of Man Booker Prize 2007
George Farquhar, dramatist
Oliver Goldsmith, writer and surgeon
John Haffenden, professor of literature
Claire Hennessy, writer and editor
Jennifer Johnston, Man Booker Prize–winning novelist
Brendan Kennelly, poet and author
William Larminie, poet
Sheridan Le Fanu, author
Michael Longley, poet
Patrick MacDonogh, poet
Rupert Mackeson, racing author
Thomas MacNevin, writer and journalist
Derek Mahon, poet
Bryan Malessa, novelist
Barry McCrea, novelist and lecturer
Mark C. McGarrity, crime fiction novelist (under pen name Bartholomew Gill)
Annemarie Ní Churreáin, poet
Melatu-Uche Okorie, short-story writer
Sally Rooney, novelist
Oliver St. John Gogarty, poet and surgeon
Jo Shapcott, poet
Thomas Southerne, dramatist
Bram Stoker, author, known for Dracula
Jonathan Swift, satirist, author of Gulliver's Travels
John Millington Synge, dramatist, poet; author of The Playboy of the Western World
Nahum Tate, lyricist and Poet Laureate
William Trevor, novelist particularly known for short stories
Trevor White, food critic and author of Kitchen Con
John Duncan Craig, poet
Oscar Wilde, poet, dramatist, wit; read Greats in Trinity 1871–1874;

Politics and government
J. E. W. Addison, British judge and Conservative politician
Ernest Alton, independent Unionist politician in the House of Commons of Southern Ireland and in Seanad Éireann
Hugh Annesley, 5th Earl Annesley, M.P. for Cavan, later an Irish representative peer in the House of Lords
Thekla Beere, civil servant and chairwoman of the ILO
John Beresford, statesman
Harman Blennerhassett, Irish-American supporter of the Burr conspiracy
Frederick Boland, diplomat and twenty-first Chancellor of the University
John Boyd, member of the Wisconsin State Assembly
Edmund Burke, philosopher, political theorist, statesman and MP for the British Whig Party
Hugh Cairns, 1st Earl Cairns, Lord Chancellor of Great Britain and Chancellor of the University of Dublin
Sir Edward Carson, leader of the Irish Unionists
Hélène Conway-Mouret, French senator and former minister
Richard Curran, National Centre Party and later Fine Gael TD
Sir Colville Deverell, Governor of the Windward Islands and Mauritius
Robert Emmet, Irish nationalist
Henry Grattan, member of the Irish House of Commons
Cecil Harmsworth, 1st Baron Harmsworth, Liberal MP and brother of press barons, Lord Northcliffe and Lord Rothermere
Mary Harney, politician, former leader of the PDs and former Tánaiste
Mark Herdman, diplomat, Governor of the British Virgin Islands (1986–1991)
Douglas Hyde, first President of Ireland
Princess Kako of Akishino, Japan
Brian Lenihan, politician, former Minister for Finance
George Macartney, British statesman (1st Earl Macartney)
Jennifer Carroll MacNeill, politician 
Richard Graves MacDonnell, Governor of South Australia, Lieutenant-Governor of Nova Scotia and Governor of Hong Kong
Josepha Madigan, politician, former Minister Minister for Culture, Heritage and the Gaeltacht
Mairead Maguire (Irish School of Ecumenics), a peace activist, winner of the Nobel Peace Prize in 1976
Mary McAleese, 8th President of Ireland
Mary Lou McDonald, politician and leader of Sinn Fein*
Leonard Greenham Star Molloy, surgeon and politician
David Norris, senator, gay rights activist and former presidential candidate
Conor Cruise O'Brien, politician, writer and academic
John O'Connell, member of parliament, leader of the Repeal Association
Liz O'Donnell, politician, former Minister for Overseas Development
Emily O'Reilly, former journalist, author, Irish Ombudsman, European Ombudsman
William Hoey Kearney Redmond, Nationalist politician; first World War fatality
Mary Robinson, former President of Ireland
Edward Stafford (politician) third Premier of New Zealand
Sir Malcolm Stevenson, Governor of Cyprus and of the Seychelles
James Stopford, 2nd Earl of Courtown, Tory politician
Leo Varadkar, politician, Taoiseach and leader of Fine Gael
Theobald Wolfe Tone, father of Irish republicanism
Jaja Wachuku first Nigerian Foreign Affairs Minister
Henry Westenra, 3rd Baron Rossmore, politician and piper
Thomas Wyse, politician and diplomat

Religion

Arthur William Barton, Church of Ireland Archbishop of Dublin
Robert Henry Charles, biblical scholar, theologian, and translator
John Nelson Darby, evangelist and Bible translator
Charles D'Arcy, Church of Ireland Archbishop of Dublin and Armagh
John Dowden, Bishop of Edinburgh and ecclesiastical historian
Richard William Enraght, Anglican priest and religious controversialist
William Fitzgerald, Church of Ireland bishop and author
David F. Ford, Regius Professor of Divinity at the University of Cambridge since 1991
Alexander Charles Garrett, bishop of the Episcopal Church in the United States of America
John Graham, author
William Connor Magee, Anglican Archbishop of York
Father John Main, OSB, Benedictine monk
Fr. Malachi Martin S.J., author
Charles Maturin, Church of Ireland clergyman and gothic author
Joseph Ferguson Peacocke, Church of Ireland Archbishop of Dublin
Robert Ram, author of The Soldiers Catechism issued to the New Model Army
William Reeves, bishop, antiquarian, and President of the Royal Irish Academy
Robert Warren Stewart, missionary to China, murdered in Kucheng Massacre
James Henthorn Todd, biblical scholar, educator, and Irish historian: Regius Professor of Hebrew
William Gowan Todd, author, cleric, and founder of St. Mary's Orphanage for Boys in London
James Ussher, Primate of All Ireland, noted for calculating the date of creation as the night preceding Sunday 23 October 4004 BC
Robert Wyse Jackson, Bishop of Limerick, Ardfert and Aghadoe

Sports

Edward Allman-Smith (1886–1969), British Army soldier and field-hockey player; Olympic silver medalist, as member of the Ireland field-hockey team at the 1908 Summer Olympics
Henry Dunlop, founder of Lansdowne Football Club and builder of Lansdowne Road stadium
Michael Gibson, rugby footballer
Ed Joyce Irish cricketer
James Lindsay-Fynn, rower, world championship gold, Great Britain, LM4 - Munich 2007
Hugo MacNeill, Ireland and British and Irish Lions rugby player
William McCrum, inventor of penalty kick of football
Robin Roe (1928–2010), clergyman and rugby footballer
Dick Spring (born 1950), Gaelic footballer, hurler, rugby footballer, businessman and politician

Other

Sir Robert Anderson, intelligence officer, theologian and policeman
Edward Chichester, 4th Marquess of Donegall
Richard Lovell Edgeworth, inventor, father of Maria Edgeworth
Mary Elmes (1908–2002), Irish aid worker who was honoured as Righteous Among the Nations for saving the lives of more than 200 Jewish children during the Second World War
Michael Elmore-Meegan, expert on global health issues, author, humanitarian, founder of charities
Scilla Elworthy, human rights campaigner
Sally Fegan-Wyles, director of UNDG
Half Hung MacNaghten, 18th-century gentleman fraudster
Kevin McCormack, dancer with Riverdance; graduated from Trinity College with a Bachelor of Science in Pharmacy
Leonard McNally, playwright, attorney, British spy
Pamela Uba, medical scientist and first black person to win Miss Ireland title

See also

List of chancellors of the University of Dublin
List of professorships at the University of Dublin
List of provosts of Trinity College Dublin
List of scholars of Trinity College Dublin

References

Trinity College Dublin-related lists
Trinity College Dublin